The Manchester North West by-election was a Parliamentary by-election held on 8 August 1912. It returned one Member of Parliament (MP)  to the House of Commons of the United Kingdom, elected by the first past the post voting system.

Vacancy
Sir George Kemp had been Liberal MP for the seat of Manchester North West since the January 1910 general elections. He stepped down from the House of Commons in 1912.

History

Candidates
The Liberal candidate was Gordon Hewart, a barrister on the Northern England circuit. He was born in Bury and educated at Manchester Grammar School. 
The Conservative candidate was Sir John Scurrah Randles, an industrialist in the coal and steel business. He had been MP for Cockermouth until his defeat in December 1910.

Campaign
Some of the prominent issues of the day were the Liberal Government's Insurance Act, German rearmament, and trade tariffs. The Unionist party at the time was divided on the issue of free trade v tariff reform. In the Manchester area, and particularly in the Exchange division which included the Royal Exchange where commercial interests were paramount, there were many Unionists who favoured the continuance of free trade and opposed plans by the Unionist leader Bonar Law to campaign in favour of trade tariffs. The Unionist candidate, Sir John Randles was particularly keen to play down this fiscal divide within Unionist ranks.
The Constituency had a large number of Jewish voters who had usually supported the Liberal candidate at election time. A leading Manchester Liberal, Nathan Laski, had been instrumental in securing support for both Winston Churchill and Kemp. However, by 1912 Laski had become upset that the Liberal government had not introduced a naturalisation bill, so decided to remain neutral.

Result

It was reckoned that the Conservative won about 50% of the Jewish vote rather than about 10% which was more usual.

Aftermath
Gordon Hewart was elected to represent Leicester in 1913.
A General Election was due to take place by the end of 1915. By the autumn of 1914, the following candidates had been adopted to contest that election. Unionist: Sir John Scurrah Randles, 
Due to the outbreak of war, the election never took place. Following boundary changes, Manchester North West was abolished and mainly replaced by Manchester Exchange.

References

 Craig, F. W. S. (1974). British parliamentary election results 1885-1918 (1 ed.). London: Macmillan.
 Wikipedia: en.wikipedia.org
 Who's Who: www.ukwhoswho.com
 Debrett's House of Commons 1916
 The chief: the biography of Gordon Hewart, Lord Chief Justice of England, 1922–40
 Rebel on the Right: Henry Page Croft and the Crisis of British Conservatism 1903-1914 by Larry L. Witherell

1912 in England
1912 elections in the United Kingdom
North West
1910s in Manchester